The Scarborough Sabres are a defunct Tier II Junior "A" ice hockey team from Weston, Ontario, Canada.

Scarborough Sabres ? - 1972

History
The Sabres started out in Scarborough, Ontario as part of the Metro Junior Hockey League.  The Sabres folded in 1972.

Season-by-Season results

Alumni
David Lumley

Defunct ice hockey teams in Canada
Ice hockey teams in Toronto
Scarborough, Toronto
1962 establishments in Ontario
Ice hockey clubs established in 1962
1972 disestablishments in Ontario
Ice hockey clubs disestablished in 1972